Hyposmocoma cryptogamiella is a species of moth of the family Cosmopterigidae. It was first described by Lord Walsingham in 1907. It is endemic to the Hawaiian islands of Kauai, Oahu, Molokai, Lanai and Hawaii. The type locality is Olaa.

The larvae feed on Acacia koa, Clermontia, Lantana, Metrosideros and Sophora species. The larvae are naked stem-borers.

External links

cryptogamiella
Endemic moths of Hawaii
Moths described in 1907
Taxa named by Thomas de Grey, 6th Baron Walsingham